For & Against is an American talk show hosted by Jim Morrison that currently airs on the LGBT channel here!. Each episode features Morrison discussing issues that affect the LGBT community.  Morrison also interviews policymakers and pundits spanning the political landscape. The show provides news and headlines from an LGBT perspective. For & Against premiered on January 6, 2012.
  
here! is producing 24 episodes for season one.

In 2012 it was announced that episodes of For & Against will be made available on online video service Hulu.

Premise
Progressive commentator Jim Morrison hosts this new 30-minute political analysis series. Speaking directly to the LGBT population about politics, politicians, and policies, For & Against offers viewers the chance to explore headlines through a uniquely LGBT lens.

Each episode features Morrison digging deeper into topical issues, ranging from campaign financing to current and future White House policy directly affecting the LGBT community. Additionally, Morrison sits down with top policymakers and pundits and challenges them on the issues that influence LGBT voters.

Cast

Main cast
 Jim Morrison serves as the show’s host and talks to newsmakers about the headlines currently affecting the LGBT community.

Guests
 Evan Wolfson
 Regan Hofmann
 Sean Strub
 Fred Karger

References

External links

2012 American television series debuts
2010s American television talk shows
Here TV original programming
2010s American LGBT-related television series